The 1940–41 Divizia B was the seventh season of the second tier of the Romanian football league system.

The league included 26 teams divided in three regional series. Many changes in the composition of the series were caused by the beginning of World War II. It was the last official season of Divizia B until 1946, when the league was resumed. The seasons played during World War II are not considered official. Also, promotions and relegations were not feasible this season because Divizia A and Divizia C were also suspended for the next 5 years.

Team changes

To Divizia B
Promoted from Divizia C
 Ateneul Tătărași Iași
 CFR Brașov
 CFR Timișoara
 Crișana CFR Arad
 Metalosport Călan
 Olympia București
 Politehnica Timișoara
 Rapid Timișoara
 Vitrometan Mediaș

Relegated from Divizia A
 CAM Timișoara
 Juventus București

From Divizia B
Relegated to Divizia C
 Astra-Metrom Brașov
 SS Doc Galați
 Victoria CFR Iași
 Sparta Mediaș

Promoted to Divizia A
 Ploiești
 Mica Brad
 Universitatea Cluj
 Craiova
 Brăila
 Gloria Arad

Excluded teams
AMEF Arad was excluded from Divizia A and substituted with Gloria Arad. The team also did not start the 1940–41 Divizia B season after being dissolved by the legionary regime.

CAM Timișoara was abusively excluded from the Divizia A and was forced to play in the Divizia B, because was a workers' football club.

Feroemail Ploiești was excluded, being another victim of the regime's law of banning workers' teams.

Maccabi București, sport club, representing the Jewish community was expelled from all the official competitions by the same legionary regime, which adopted antisemitic policies.

Other teams
CA Oradea, Crișana Oradea, CS Târgu Mureș, Mureșul Târgu Mureș, Olimpia CFR Satu Mare, Oltul Sfântu Gheorghe, Stăruința Oradea, Victoria Carei and Victoria Cluj moved in the Hungarian football league system due to the Second Vienna Award which was signed on 30 August 1940, territory of Northern Transylvania being assigned from Romania to Hungary.

Universitatea Cluj was promoted in the Divizia A instead of Crișana Oradea, even that the Second Vienna Award regard also Cluj-Napoca in the territory of Northern Transylvania, Universitatea refused to play in Hungary and relocated to Sibiu, being renamed as Universitatea Cluj-Sibiu.

Dragoș Vodă Cernăuți and Muncitorul Cernăuți (Northern Bukovina), Maccabi Chișinău, Nistru Chișinău and Traian Tighina (Bessarabia) were not allowed to play anymore in the Romanian football league system due to the Soviet occupation of Bessarabia and Northern Bukovina during June 28 – July 4, 1940, which had as result the Soviet annexation of the region.

League tables

Serie I

Serie II

Serie III

See also 

 1940–41 Divizia A

References

Liga II seasons
Romania
2